The Lesser Blessed is a Canadian drama film, released in 2012. The film was written and directed by Anita Doron and is based on the novel of the same name by Richard Van Camp, the film stars Joel Evans as Larry Sole, a young Tłı̨chǫ teenager living in the Northwest Territories. The film's cast also includes Chloe Rose, Kiowa Gordon, Benjamin Bratt, Dylan Cook and Tamara Podemski. Despite being set in the Northwest Territories, the film was shot in Sudbury, Ontario.

The film premiered at the imagineNATIVE Film + Media Arts Festival in 2012 to critical acclaim. Doron garnered a Canadian Screen Award nomination for Best Adapted Screenplay at the 1st Canadian Screen Awards. The film later screened at the Toronto International Film Festival in 2012.

Plot

The film follows a shy teenager living in a small, remote community in the Northwest Territories of Canada and dealing with life as a high school student. The film explores several typical teen issues, such as alienation and the search for one's own identity, but in this case from the perspective of a Dogrib Indian who struggles between his Native ancestry and finding his place in to the modern world.

Cast
 Benjamin Bratt as Jed
 Joel Evans as Larry Sole
 Kiowa Gordon as Johnny Beck
Chloe Rose as Juliet Hope
Adam Butcher as Darcy McManus
Krista Bridges as Auntie
Tamara Podemski as Verna Sole
Spencer Van Wyck as Kevin Garner
Dylan Cook as Mustache Sammy
Jacob Neayem as Clarence Jerome

Release
In February 2013, Monterey Media brought the US distribution rights from Entertainment One. The film was released in Toronto on May 31, 2013, and in Montréal, Winnipeg, Edmonton and Ottawa the week after. The film was released in the United States on home entertainment (DVD and Video on Demand) on June 25, 2013.

Accolades 
Doron garnered a Canadian Screen Award nomination for Best Adapted Screenplay at the 1st Canadian Screen Awards. Kiowa Gordon won best supporting actor at American Indian Film Festival for his role in the film.

References

External links
 
 

2012 films
Canadian drama films
English-language Canadian films
First Nations films
Films shot in Greater Sudbury
Films set in the Northwest Territories
2012 drama films
2010s English-language films
2010s Canadian films